Akshata Narayan Murty (born April 1980) is an Indian heiress, businesswoman, fashion designer, and venture capitalist. She is married to Rishi Sunak, the prime minister of the United Kingdom and leader of the Conservative Party. According to the Sunday Times Rich List, Murty and Sunak are the 222nd richest people in Britain , with a combined wealth of £730 million (US$830 million). In 2022, her personal wealth became the topic of British media discussion in the context of her claim of non-domiciled status in the United Kingdom, an arrangement seen as benefiting the "super rich". Murty later voluntarily renounced the fiscal benefits from her non-domiciled status.

She is the daughter of N. R. Narayana Murthy, a founder of the Indian multinational IT company Infosys, and Sudha Murty. She holds a 0.93-per-cent stake in Infosys, along with shares in several other British businesses.

Early life and education 
Akshata Murty was born in April 1980 in Hubli, India, and was raised by her maternal grandparents while her father N. R. Narayana Murthy and her mother Sudha Murty worked to launch their technology company, Infosys. Her mother was the first female engineer to work for the TATA Engineering and Locomotive Company, then India's largest car maker, and later became a philanthropist. Murty has one brother, Rohan Murty, and they were brought up in Jayanagar, a suburb of Bangalore. Her maternal grandparents were R. H. Kulkarni, a surgeon, and his wife Vimala Kulkarni, a school teacher.

In the 1990s, Murty attended Baldwin Girls' High School, Bangalore, and in 1998 studied economics and French at Claremont McKenna College in California. She has a diploma in clothes manufacturing from the Fashion Institute of Design & Merchandising, and a Master of Business Administration from Stanford University.

Career and investments 
In 2007, Murty joined the Dutch cleantech firm Tendris as its marketing director, where she worked for two years, before leaving to start her own fashion firm.

Her fashion label closed in 2012. In 2013, she became the director of venture capital fund Catamaran Ventures. She co-founded, with her husband Rishi Sunak, the London branch of the Indian firm owned by her father, N. R. Narayana Murthy. Sunak transferred his shares to her shortly before being elected as the Conservative MP for Richmond in 2015. Since 2015, she has owned a 0.91% or 0.93% share of her father's technology firm Infosys, valued at around £700 million in April 2022, and shares in two of Jamie Oliver's restaurant businesses, Wendy's in India, and Koro Kids. This made her richer than Queen Elizabeth II , and richer than King Charles III as of October 2022. , Murthy was a director at Digme Fitness, and also Sococo, the digital transformation company that her brother Rohan Murty co-founded.

Personal life 

Murty is a citizen of India. In August 2009, Murty married Rishi Sunak, whom she met at Stanford University. They have two daughters – Anoushka and Krishna. They own Kirby Sigston Manor in the village of Kirby Sigston, North Yorkshire, as well as a mews house in Earl's Court in central London, a flat on the Old Brompton Road, South Kensington, and a penthouse apartment on Ocean Avenue in Santa Monica, California. In April 2022, it was reported that Sunak and Murty had moved out of 11 Downing Street to a newly refurbished West London home.

In April 2022, Murty's wealth became the focus of British media discussion that noted her non-domiciled resident of the United Kingdom, which entitled her to pay no tax on her income outside Britain, subject to an annual payment of £30,000. Later the same month, Murty announced that she would give up her non-domiciled status and pay UK taxes on her worldwide income voluntarily. If Murty pays UK taxes on her worldwide income, but retains her non-domiciliary status, she can benefit from a provision in a 1956 treaty that was designed to help avoid double taxation of Indian citizens in India as well as the UK.

References

External links 

 Bhat, Chandrashekar.  (14 April 2022) Rishi Sunak's wife set to receive £6m from Infosys (EasternEye)

1980 births
Living people
Claremont McKenna College alumni
Fashion Institute of Technology alumni
Stanford Graduate School of Business alumni
Indian company founders
Indian emigrants to the United Kingdom
Indian fashion designers
Indian women company founders
Murthy family
Spouses of prime ministers of the United Kingdom
Sunak family
21st-century Indian businesswomen
21st-century Indian businesspeople
Indian women fashion designers
Indian venture capitalists
Women investors